An overlapping circles grid is a geometric pattern of repeating, overlapping circles of an equal radius in two-dimensional space. Commonly, designs are based on circles centered on triangles (with the simple, two circle form named vesica piscis) or on the square lattice pattern of points.

Patterns of seven overlapping circles appear in historical artefacts from the 7th century BC onwards; they become a frequently used ornament in the Roman Empire period, and survive into medieval artistic traditions both in Islamic art (girih decorations) and in Gothic art. The name "Flower of Life" is given to the overlapping circles pattern in New Age publications.

Of special interest is the six petal rosette derived from the "seven overlapping circles" pattern, also known as "Sun of the Alps" from its frequent use in alpine folk art in the 17th and 18th century.

Triangular grid of overlapping circles 

The triangular lattice form, with circle radii equal to their separation is called a seven overlapping circles grid. It contains 6 circles intersecting at a point, with a 7th circle centered on that intersection.

Overlapping circles with similar geometrical constructions have been used infrequently in various of the decorative arts since ancient times. The pattern has found a wide range of usage in popular culture, in fashion, jewelry, tattoos and decorative products.

Cultural significance

Near East
The oldest known occurrence of the "overlapping circles" pattern is dated to the 7th or 6th century BCE, 
found on the threshold of the palace of Assyrian king Aššur-bāni-apli in Dur Šarrukin (now in the Louvre).

The design becomes more widespread in the early centuries of the Common Era.
One early example are five patterns of 19 overlapping circles drawn on the granite columns at the Temple of Osiris in Abydos, Egypt, and a further five on column opposite the building. They are drawn in red ochre and some are very faint and difficult to distinguish.
The patterns are graffiti, and not found in natively Egyptian ornaments. They are mostly dated to the early centuries of the Christian Era 
although medieval or even modern (early 20th century) origin cannot be ruled out with certainty, as the drawings are not mentioned in the extensive listings of graffiti at the temple compiled by Margaret Murray in 1904.

Similar patterns were sometimes used in England as apotropaic marks to keep witches from entering buildings. Consecration crosses indicating points in churches anointed with holy water during a churches dedication also take the form of overlapping circles.

In Islamic art, the pattern is one of several arrangements of circles (others being used for fourfold or fivefold designs) used to construct grids for Islamic geometric patterns. It is used to design patterns with 6- and 12-pointed stars as well as hexagons in the style called girih. The resulting patterns however characteristically conceal the construction grid, presenting instead a design of interlaced strapwork.

Europe
Patterns of seven overlapping circles are found on a Cypro-Archaic I cup of the 8th-7th century BC in Cyprus and Roman mosaics, for example at Herod's palace in the 1st century BC.

The design is found on one of the silver plaques of the Late Roman hoard of Kaiseraugst (discovered 1961).
It is later found as an ornament in Gothic architecture, and still later in European folk art of the early modern period.

High medieval examples include the Cosmati pavements in Westminster Abbey (13th century).
Leonardo da Vinci explicitly discussed the mathematical proportions of the design.

Modern usage 

The name "Flower of Life" is modern, associated with the New Age movement, and commonly attributed specifically to Drunvalo Melchizedek in his book The Ancient Secret of the Flower of Life (1999).

The pattern and modern name have propagated into wide range of usage in popular culture, in fashion, jewelry, tattoos and decorative products.
The pattern in quilting has been called diamond wedding ring or triangle wedding ring to contrast it from the square pattern.
Besides an occasional use in fashion, it is also used in the decorative arts. For example, the album Sempiternal (2013) by Bring Me the Horizon uses the 61 overlapping circles grid as the main feature of its album cover, whereas the album A Head Full of Dreams (2015) by Coldplay features the 19 overlapping circles grid as the central part of its album cover. Teaser posters illustrating the cover art to A Head Full of Dreams were widely displayed on the London Underground in the last week of October 2015.

The "Sun of the Alps" (Italian Sole delle Alpi) symbol has been used as the emblem of Padanian nationalism in northern Italy since the 1990s. It resembles a pattern often found in that area on buildings.

Gallery

1, 7, and 19-circle hexagonal variant
In the examples below the pattern has a hexagonal outline, and is further circumscribed.

Similar patterns

In the examples below the pattern does not have a hexagonal outline.

Construction 
Martha Bartfeld, author of geometric art tutorial books, described her independent discovery of the design in 1968. Her original definition said, "This design consists of circles having a 1-[inch; 25 mm] radius, with each point of intersection serving as a new center. The design can be expanded ad infinitum depending upon the number of times the odd-numbered points are marked off."

The pattern figure can be drawn by pen and compass, by creating multiple series of interlinking circles of the same diameter touching the previous circle's center. The second circle is centered at any point on the first circle. All following circles are centered on the intersection of two other circles.

Progressions 
The pattern can be extended outwards in concentric hexagonal rings of circles, as shown. The first row shows rings of circles. The second row shows a three-dimensional interpretation of a set of n×n×n cube of spheres viewed from a diagonal axis. The third row shows the pattern completed with partial circle arcs within a set of completed circles.

Expanding sets have 1, 7, 19, 37, 61, 91, 127, etc. circles, and continuing ever larger hexagonal rings of circles. The number of circles is n3-(n-1)3 = 3n2-3n+1 = 3n(n-1)+1.

These overlapping circles can also be seen as a projection of an n-unit cube of spheres in 3-dimensional space, viewed on the diagonal axis. There are more spheres than circles because some are overlapping in 2 dimensions.

Other variations 
Another triangular lattice form is common, with circle separation as the square root of 3 times their radius. Richard Kershner showed in 1939 that no arrangement of circles can cover the plane more efficiently than this hexagonal lattice arrangement.

Two offset copies of this circle pattern makes a rhombic tiling pattern, while three copies make the original triangular pattern.

Related concepts 
The center lens of the 2-circle figure is called a vesica piscis, from Euclid. Two circles are also called Villarceau circles as a plane intersection of a torus. The areas inside one circle and outside the other circle is called a lune.

The 3-circle figure resembles a depiction of borromean rings and is used in 3-set theory Venn diagrams. Its interior makes a unicursal path called a triquetra. The center of the 3-circle figure is called a reuleaux triangle.

Some spherical polyhedra with edges along great circles can be stereographically projected onto the plane as overlapping circles. 

The 7-circle pattern has also been called an Islamic seven-circles pattern for its use in Islamic art.

Square grid of overlapping circles 

The square lattice form can be seen with circles that line up horizontally and vertically, while intersecting on their diagonals. The pattern appears slightly different when rotated on its diagonal, also called a centered square lattice form because it can be seen as two square lattices with each centered on the gaps of the other.

It is called a Kawung motif in Indonesian batik, and is found on the walls of the 8th century Hindu temple Prambanan in Java.

It is called an Apsamikkum from ancient Mesopotamian mathematics.

See also 
 Uniform tiling symmetry mutations - pattern mutations in 3D space
 Knot theory

References

External links 
 
 The flower of life article from The Mystica

Sacred geometry
Circles
Patterns
Religious symbols